The Ștefan Gheorghiu Academy  (Romanian: Academia Ștefan Gheorghiu, in full: Academia de învăţămînt social-politic Ștefan Gheorghiu de pe lîngă CC al PCR - approx. Ștefan Gheorghiu Academy for Socio-Political Education in Relation to the Central Committee of the Romanian Communist Party) was a university created and used by the Romanian Communist Party (PCR) for training its cadres for executive and agitprop-related functions.

History
It was established as Universitatea Muncitorească a PCR (PCR Workers' University) and began functioning on March 21, 1945, in Bucharest, apparently on Ana Pauker's initiative. Its first leaders were rector Barbu Lăzăreanu, a literature professor, and secretary Constantin Ionescu-Gulian, a Stalinist philosopher. The name Ștefan Gheorghiu was added on February 10, 1946, in memory of an early 20th-century Romanian social-democrat.

Another school with much the same purpose, Școala Superioară de Știinţe Sociale  A. A. Jdanov (A. A. Jdanov Upper School of Social Sciences), was created separately; the two eventually merged.

The Ștefan Gheorghiu Academy was dissolved after the Romanian Revolution of 1989.

References

Educational institutions established in 1945
Educational institutions disestablished in 1989
History of Bucharest
Romanian Communist Party
1945 establishments in Romania
Universities and colleges in Bucharest